The 38th NAACP Image Awards ceremony, presented by the National Association for the Advancement of Colored People (NAACP), honored the best in film, television, music of 2006 and took place on March 2, 2007, at the Shrine Auditorium. The show was televised live on Fox at 8 p.m. EST and hosted by LL Cool J. The nominees were announced on January 7, 2007, at a press conference in at the Peninsula Hotel in Beverly Hills, California.  The winners and nominees are shown below.  The winners are indicated in bold.

List of nominees and winners

Television

Comedy

Outstanding Comedy Series

All of Us
The Bernie Mac Show
Everybody Hates Chris
Girlfriends
Ugly Betty

Outstanding Actor in a Comedy Series
Bernie Mac - The Bernie Mac Show
Donald Faison – Scrubs
Duane Martin – All of Us
George Lopez – The George Lopez Show
Tyler James Williams – Everybody Hates Chris

Outstanding Actress in a Comedy Series
America Ferrera – Ugly Betty
Maya Rudolph – Saturday Night Live
Raven-Symoné – That's So Raven
Tichina Arnold – Everybody Hates Chris
Tracee Ellis Ross – Girlfriends

Outstanding Supporting Actor in a Comedy Series
Antonio Fargas – Everybody Hates Chris
Reggie Hayes – Girlfriends
Romany Malco – Weeds
Terry Crews – Everybody Hates Chris
Victor Williams – The King of Queens

Outstanding Supporting Actress in a Comedy Series
Dee Dee Davis – The Bernie Mac Show
LisaRaye McCoy – All of Us
Telma Hopkins – Half & Half
Vanessa L. Williams – Ugly Betty
Whoopi Goldberg– Everybody Hates Chris

Drama

Outstanding Drama Series
24
Grey's Anatomy
Heroes
The Unit
The Wire

Outstanding Actor Drama Series
Dennis Haysbert – The Unit
Hill Harper – CSI: NY
Isaiah Washington – Grey's Anatomy
Jesse L. Martin – Law & Order
Michael K. Williams – The Wire

Outstanding Actress Drama Series
CCH Pounder – The Shield
Jennifer Beals – The L Word
Kimberly Elise – Close to Home
Regina Taylor – The Unit
Roselyn Sánchez – Without a Trace

Outstanding Supporting Actor Drama Series
Gary Dourdan – CSI: Crime Scene Investigation
Glynn Turman – The Wire
James Pickens, Jr. – Grey's Anatomy
Omar Epps – House
Wendell Pierce – The Wire

Outstanding Supporting Actress Drama Series
Chandra Wilson – Grey's Anatomy
Khandi Alexander – CSI: Miami
Marianne Jean-Baptiste – Without a Trace
S. Epatha Merkerson – Law & Order
Sanaa Lathan– Nip/Tuck

Movie, Mini-Series, or Dramatic Special

Outstanding Television Movie, Mini-Series or Dramatic Special
Life is Not a Fairytale: The Fantasia Barrino Story
Sleeper Cell: American Terror
Tsunami: The Aftermath
The Untold Story of Emmett Louis Till
When the Levees Broke: A Requiem in Four Acts

Outstanding Actor in a Television Movie, Mini-Series or Dramatic Special
Andre Braugher – Thief (TV series)
Chiwetel Ejiofor – Tsunami, the Aftermath
Clarence Williams III – Mystery Woman
Kadeem Hardison – Life Is Not a Fairytale: The Fantasia Barrino Story
Michael Ealy – Sleeper Cell: American Terror

Outstanding Actress in a Television Movie, Mini-Series or Dramatic Special
Aisha Tyler – For One Night
Fantasia Barrino – Life is Not a Fairytale: The Fantasia Barrino Story
Loretta Devine – Life is Not a Fairytale: The Fantasia Barrino Story
Patti LaBelle – Why I Wore Lipstick to My Mastectomy
Sophie Okonedo – Tsunami, the Aftermath

Daytime Drama

Outstanding Actor in a Daytime Drama Series
Antonio Sabato Jr. – The Bold and the Beautiful
Bryton McClure – The Young and the Restless
James Reynolds – Days of Our Lives
Kristoff St. John – The Young and the Restless
Michael B. Jordan – All My Children

Outstanding Actress in a Daytime Drama Series
Christel Khalil – The Young and the Restless
Davetta Sherwood – The Young and the Restless
Renée Elise Goldsberry – One Life to Live
Tracey Ross – Passions
Yvonna Wright – Guiding Light

Variety Programming

Outstanding Reality Series
American Idol
America's Next Top Model
Black. White.
Dancing with the Stars
Run's House

Outstanding Variety - Series or Special
2006 Black Movie Awards – A Celebration of Black Cinema: Past, Present, and Future
BET Awards 2006
Cedric The Entertainer: Taking You Higher
An Evening of Stars: Tribute to Stevie Wonder
Jamie Foxx: Unpredictable

Outstanding Children’s Program
The Backyardigans
Dora the Explorer
High School Musical
Romeo!
That's So Raven

Outstanding Performance in a Youth/Children's Program - Series or Special
Corbin Bleu – High School Musical
Kathleen Herles – Dora the Explorer
Kyle Massey – That's So Raven
Raven-Symoné – That's So Raven
Romeo – Romeo!

Music Categories

Outstanding New Artist
Cherish
Corinne Bailey Rae
LeToya
Lupe Fiasco
Mario Vazquez

Outstanding Male Artist
Chris Brown
Jay-Z
John Legend
Lionel Richie
Prince

Outstanding Female Artist
Beyoncé
Corinne Bailey Rae
Fantasia
India.Arie
Mary J. Blige

Outstanding Duo or Group
The Cheetah Girls
Dave Matthews Band
Gnarls Barkley
Outkast
The Roots

Outstanding Jazz Artist
George Duke
Gerald Albright
Gladys Knight
Regina Carter
Take 6

Outstanding Gospel Artist -- Traditional or Contemporary
Andraé Crouch – Mighty Wind
The Cast of Inspired By...The Bible Experience– Inspired...The Bible Experience: New Testament
Fred Hammond – Free To Worship
Kirk Franklin – Imagine Me
Patti LaBelle – The Gospel According To Patti

Outstanding Music Video
Beyoncé – Irreplaceable
India.Arie – I Am Not My Hair
Jay-Z – Show Me What You Got
Mary J. Blige – Be Without You
Prince – Black Sweat

Outstanding Song
"Be Without You"– Mary J. Blige
"Crazy" – Gnarls Barkley
"I Am Not My Hair" – India.Arie
"Irreplaceable" – Beyoncé
"Save Room" – John Legend

Outstanding Album
B'Day – Beyoncé
Corinne Bailey Rae – Corinne Bailey Rae
Dreamgirls (Soundtrack) – VariousOnce Again – John Legend
Reflections: A Retrospective – Mary J. Blige

Literary Categories

Outstanding Literary Work – Fiction
After – Marita Golden
All Aunt Hager’s Children – Edward P. JonesBaby Brother's Blues – Pearl CleageFortunate Son: A Novel – Walter Mosley
Wizard of the Crow – Ngũgĩ wa Thiong'o

Outstanding Literary Work – Non-FictionThe Audacity of Hope: Thoughts on Reclaiming the American Dream – Barack ObamaCome Hell or High Water: Hurricane Katrina and the Color of Disaster – Michael Eric Dyson
The Covenant With Black America – Tavis Smiley
Forty Million Dollar Slaves: The Rise, Fall, and Redemption of the Black Athlete – William C. Rhoden
Not In My Family: AIDS in the African American Community – Gil Robertson IV

Outstanding Literary Work – Debut Author
A Dead Man Speaks – Lisa Jones Johnson
Boldfaced Lies – Charlene A. Porter
The Legend of Quito Road – Dwight Fryer
Letters to a Young Brother – Hill Harper
Uncloudy Days: The Gospel Music Encyclopedia – Bil Carpenter

Outstanding Literary Work – Biography/Auto-Biography
Before the Legend: The Rise of Bob Marley – Christopher John Farley
Jim Brown: The Fierce Life of an American Hero – Mike Freeman
Jokes My Father Never Taught Me – Rain PryorThe Pursuit of Happyness – Chris GardnerUnbowed – Wangari Maathai

Outstanding Literary Work – InstructionalMama Made The Difference – T. D. JakesThe Mocha Manual To a Fabulous Pregnancy – Kimberly Allers
Shine – Star Jones Reynolds
Skinny Cooks Can’t Be Trusted – Mo'Nique Imes Jackson
Southern Homecoming Traditions: Recipes And Remembrances – Carolyn Quick Tillery

Outstanding Literary Work – PoetryCelebrations: Rituals of Peace and Prayer – Maya AngelouCheck the Rhyme: An Anthology of Female Poets & Emcees – DuEwa M. Frazier
Hoops – Major Jackson
Jazz – Walter Dean Myers
We Speak Your Names – Pearl Cleag

Outstanding Literary Work – Children
Dear Mr. Rosenwald – Carole Boston Weatherford
I Like You But I Love Me – Lonnie LynnMoses: When Harriet Tubman Led Her People to Freedom – Carole Boston WeatherfordNobody Gonna Turn Me’Round – Doreen Rappaport
Whoopi’s Big Book of Manners – Whoopi Goldberg

Outstanding Literary Work – Youth/Teens
Copper Sun – Sharon M. Draper
Freedom Walkers: The Story of the Montgomery Bus Boycott – Russell FreedmanLetters to a Young Brother – Hill HarperMaya Angelou – Donna Brown Agins
Superwoman's Child – J. L. Woodson

Motion Pictures

Outstanding Motion PictureAkeelah and the Bee
Blood Diamond
Catch a Fire
Dreamgirls
The Pursuit of Happyness

Outstanding Independent or Foreign Film
Curse of the Golden Flower
Days of Glory (Indigènes)
An Inconvenient Truth
Tsotsi
Volver

Outstanding Actor in a Motion Picture
Denzel Washington – Inside Man
Forest Whitaker – The Last King of Scotland
Jamie Foxx – Dreamgirls
Laurence Fishburne – Akeelah and the Bee
Will Smith – The Pursuit of Happyness

Outstanding Actress in a Motion Picture
Beyoncé Knowles – Dreamgirls
Keke Palmer – Akeelah and the Bee
Penélope Cruz – Volver
Queen Latifah – Last Holiday
Sanaa Lathan – Something New

Outstanding Supporting Actor in a Motion Picture
Danny Glover –  Dreamgirls
Djimon Hounsou – Blood Diamond
Eddie Murphy –  Dreamgirls
Harry Belafonte – Bobby
Jaden Christopher Syre Smith – The Pursuit of Happyness

Outstanding Supporting Actress in a Motion Picture
Angela Bassett – Akeelah and the Bee
Anika Noni Rose – Dreamgirls
Jennifer Hudson – Dreamgirls
Kerry Washington - The Last King of Scotland
Thandie Newton – The Pursuit of Happyness

Directing

Outstanding Directing in a Comedy Series
Ali LeRoi – Everybody Hates Chris ("Everybody Hates Elections")
Ken Whittingham – The Office ("Michael's Birthday")
Lauren Breiting – According to Jim ("The Stick")
Millicent Shelton – Everybody Hates Chris ("Everybody Hates Valentine's Day")
Salim Akil – Girlfriends ("The Game")

Outstanding Directing in a Dramatic Series
Anthony Hemingway – Close to Home ("Prodigal Son")
Craig Ross, Jr. – Bones ("Aliens in a Spaceship"
Karen Gaviola – Lost ("The Whole Truth")
Paris Barclay – Cold Case  ("Saving Sammy")
Seith Mann – The Wire ("Homerooms")

Outstanding Directing in a Feature Film/Television Movie - Comedy or Drama
Alejandro González Iñárritu – BabelChris Robinson – ATLSanaa Hamri – Something NewSpike Lee – Inside Man
Tyler Perry – Madea's Family ReunionWriting

Outstanding Writing in a Comedy Series
Kenny Smith – The Game ("The Trey Wiggs Episode")
Mara Brock Akil – Girlfriends ("After the Storm")
Regina Y. Hicks – Girlfriends ("I’ll Have a Blueline Christmas")
Royale Watkins – All Of Us ("The -N- Word")
Silvio Horta – Ugly Betty ("Pilot")

Outstanding Writing in a Dramatic Series
Aaron Rahsaan Thomas – Friday Night Lights ("Full Hearts")
Janine Sherman-Barrois – ER ("Darfur")
Naren Chankar – CSI: Crime Scene Investigation ("Killer")
Shonda Rhimes – Grey’s Anatomy ("It's the End of the World")
Steven Maeda – Day Break ("What if He Lets Her Go")

Outstanding Writing in a Feature Film/Television Movie - Comedy or Drama
Dianne Houston – Take the LeadDoug Atchison – Akeelah and the Bee
Keith Glover – Life is Not a Fairytale: The Fantasia Barrino StoryReggie Gaskins – Restraining OrderTyler Perry – Madea's Family Reunion''

Special awards
The following recipients received distinguished awards by the NAACP for their contributions to arts, civil rights, news, and humanitarian efforts.

Hall of Fame Award
Bill Cosby

Chairman's Award
Bono

President's Award
Soledad O'Brien

References

External links
38th Annual NAACP Image Awards Official Site (Archived)

NAACP Image Awards
N
N
N